Spent Bullets is the second studio album by Adam Franklin.

Track listing 
All tracks by Adam Franklin

 "Surge" – 3:01
 "Teardrops Keep Fallin' Out My Head" – 3:01
 "Bolts of Melody" – 4:59
 "Autumn Leaf" – 3:30
 "Winter Girls" – 4:03
 "It Hurts to See You Go" – 4:10
 "Big Sur" – 3:27
 "Champs" – 4:05
 "End Credits" – 2:44
 "Two Dollar Dress" – 3:34

Personnel 

Adam Franklin – bass, guitar, composer, keyboards, vocals, producer, mixing, cover design
Locksley Taylor – guitar, piano, cover design, guitar engineer, bass engineer, piano engineer, keyboard engineer
Jeff Townsin – drums
Josh Stoddard - bass
Charlie Francis – producer, mixing, vocal engineer, bass engineer
Robin Proper-Sheppard - drums engineer
Tim Turan – mastering
Mary Gunn – layout design
Stephen Judge – management

References

Adam Franklin albums
2009 albums